The W. D. Boyce Council of the Boy Scouts of America serves youth in central Illinois, from Lincoln to Ottawa, and Peoria to Bloomington.

Organization
The council is divided into districts:
 Crossroads District - Serving youth in DeWitt, Livingston, Logan, McLean, and part of Ford county.
 Heartland District - Serving youth in Fulton, Marshall, and Peoria counties.
 Lowaneu District - Serving youth in Bureau, Putnam, and LaSalle counties.
 Wotamalo District - Serving youth in Woodford, Tazewell, Mason, and part of Logan county.

History

Formerly the Starved Rock Area Council, Corn Belt Council and the Creve Coeur Council, W.D. Boyce Council was created by merger and renamed in 1973 in honor of the founder of the BSA, whose grave and monument lie overlooking the Illinois River not far from the Ottawa Scouting Museum in Ottawa, Illinois. The council headquarters is in Peoria, Illinois.  The council runs Ingersoll Scout Reservation west of Peoria and Cache Lake Scout Camp in Ontario, Canada.  W.D. Boyce Council is served by Wenasa Quenhotan Lodge #23.

Camp Ki-Shau-Wau is a former Boy Scout camp owned by the Starved Rock Area Council (and later by the W.D. Boyce Council after the merger in 1972) located two miles southeast of Lowell, Illinois along the Vermillion river. Its first name was Camp Pontiac. Shortly after, it was renamed after the three Scouting districts known as Kinebo, Shabbona and Waubuncie (Ki-Shau-Wau). The last official summer camp program was held in 1976. The camp  opened in 1926 and was sold in 1989. The site is a private retreat, http://www.kishauwaucabins.com/, today where cabins can be rented.  In the movie "Fracture", Ryan Gosling's character can be seen wearing a Camp Ki-Shau-Wau T-shirt in one scene.

Camp Heffernan is a former Boy Scout camp owned by the Corn Belt Council. It is located north of Normal, Illinois on Lake Bloomington.  It is now owned by Easter Seals of Central Illinois and has been renamed Timber Pointe Outdoor Center.

Camp Wokanda is a former Boy Scout camp located just north of the city of Peoria, Illinois. The grounds are set on the edge of the Illinois River Valley and are bordered by Mossville Road, Mossville proper (and the natural gas pipeline) Colony Point and Deerbrook Subdivisions, and Cedar Hills Road.

The Boy Scouts sold the property to the Peoria Park District in the 1990s and built a new camp farther north of the city. The Park District rents out the main meeting house for parties and created a few new trails that cross from the Camp over to Robinson Park, which abuts the campgrounds.

Camps

Ingersoll Scout Reservation

Ingersoll Scout Reservation (ISR, or simply Ingersoll) is the primary resident camp of the W.D. Boyce Council of the Boy Scouts of America. Located just west of London Mills, Illinois, the reservation encompasses almost 1000 acres of woodland and prairie between Fulton and Knox Counties. The Cedar Creek, a tributary of the Spoon River, forms most of the southern boundary of the camp. Initially founded as Wilderness Camp in 1963, the camp was renamed in 1973 to posthumously honor William P. Ingersoll, a local philanthropist who helped in the camp's initial purchase.

Geography
Ingersoll straddles Fulton and Knox Counties, meaning that the Knox portion of the camp actually lies outside of the W.D. Boyce Council. Some of the roads in camp, mostly those built prior to the camp's establishment, follow this county line. Camp roads are mostly unpaved and one-lane, winding around the camp as topography allows. Illinois Route 116 curves around the camp after crossing the Spoon River at London Mills. Route 116 is the camp's primary means of access.

For camping purposes, Ingersoll is often divided into two parts: "Main Camp," which consists of the developed area west of Lake Roberts used for most camp programs; and the "East Side," the largely undeveloped area east of Lake Roberts with minimal road and trail access used primarily for hiking. The 14-mile Cedar Creek Trail follows the periphery of the entire camp.

The numerous small creeks and gullies emptying into Cedar Creek on the southern edge of Ingersoll gives the camp unusually varied topography for the area. This is most visible at "Dining Hall Hill," the main thoroughfare of the camp, which is located on a long incline overlooking the broad Cedar Creek Valley. One minor tributary of the Cedar Creek was dammed in 1963, forming 17-acre Lake Roberts. The camp has another "lake" in the far East Side, Lake McCutcheon, which is actually a small pond fed by the periodic flooding of the Cedar Creek.

Forests at Ingersoll tend to be of relatively young growth, as much of the reservation was formerly farmland. There are notable exceptions to this, especially along the Cedar Creek, where enormous trees have been left undisturbed. The soil of Ingersoll consists largely of loess from the Illinoian glaciation.

The reservation is home to many native Illinois wildlife species, including white-tailed deer, raccoons, wild turkey, foxes, and coyotes. Beavers have also been known to make their homes on the Cedar Creek, though they are rarely sighted. The entire camp is designated as a wildlife preservation area by the state of Illinois. In less-developed regions of the camp, native prairie grasses have been allowed to grow, creating a habitat for many native plants.

Facilities
The dining hall is the center of resident camp activities. It includes indoor and outdoor seating, a kitchen, and an adjacent commissary building. Troops have the option of eating at the dining hall or preparing food picked up from the commissary in their own campsites, "Jambo style." The flagpole in front of the dining hall is the site of daily flag ceremonies. During the winter months, the dining hall is used for cold-weather camping. These rest at the top of a hill known as "Heartattack Hill" due to the steep incline.

The Old Commissary is one of the oldest camp buildings. Originally donated by Caterpillar Inc., the large wooden shed was moved into the camp from another location to serve as camp supply building and trading post. Later, a quartermaster building was built on to the original structure. Following more construction elsewhere in camp during the 1970s, the trading post was converted into the camp office, the commissary into a health lodge and office space, and the quartermaster building into the Wilderness Training Center, a conference room used for training sessions. This facility is also used for lodging during the winter months.

In 2007, Ingersoll opened a 50-foot tall climbing tower. It features 3 walls of varying difficulty, a giant's ladder, and a 350-foot zipline to the ground below. The Climbing merit badge is instructed here during summer resident camp.

Finished in 2008, the lakefront area at Lake Roberts contains a sand beach, a large dock, boat storage, and teaching space. Boating merit badges, including Rowing, Canoeing, and Small Boat Sailing are taught here during the summer months. Across the lake, the Fish Shack contains teaching space for the Fishing and Fly Fishing merit badges, as well as facilities for cleaning and preparing fish. Other Aquatics merit badges such as Swimming are taught at the pool.

There are also many other program areas at Ingersoll, including a shooting range that offers .22 caliber rifles, archery, and 20 gauge shotgun shooting. Scoutcraft offers many programs and merit badges helping the visiting Scouts with their outdoor skills, Scouting lore, and many forms of time-cherished crafts such as woodcarving and basketry. Ecology and Conservation, often referred to as Eco-Con, offers the nature and science merit badges and programs, and hosts many competitions unique to Ingersoll, such as Treemail, a series of challenges that Scouts can undertake as individuals and groups to earn points for their troops. The troop that advances the farthest by the end of the week is recognized at the closing campfire. Ingersoll also offers a cooking program, where Scouts become familiar with outdoor cookware and creative ways to prepare different foods while camping.

Ingersoll also offers several Camp Wilderness outposts. In the morning, a troop may choose to go to the Paul Bunyan outpost instead of the normal breakfast at the Dining Hall. Paul Bunyan is an interpretive program based on an old-fashioned Minnesota logger camp, complete with staff in period attire, serving pancakes and sausage for breakfast, and offering such activities as tomahawk throwing, kubb, loggerball , crosscut saws, and spar pole climbing. The lunch activity is a trip down to Crawdad Landing on the Cedar Creek, where Scouts eat a sack lunch and spend an hour sliding down a giant tarp into the creek, often getting extremely muddy in the process. Enduring as one of Ingersoll's most popular attractions, Horseshoe Bend is the dinner outpost and interpretive program based on a cantina in the Old West. The program includes horseshoes, tomahawk throwing, a blacksmith forge, lassoing "cattle" and even a "bucking bronco". Much of the food is prepared over an open fire or in Dutch ovens. Dessert consists of IBC Root Beer, kettle corn, and fresh, homemade ice cream, hand-cranked by volunteering Scouts. For a few years in the early 2010s, the Camp Wilderness program incorporated a program called Indian Village. Here, campers had the opportunity to learn Indian Leg Wrestling as well as Indian Stick Wrestling. Later on, campers were able to try their hand at throwing atlatls, a form of Native American spear.  This lunchtime program, unlike the other main parts of Camp Wilderness, was not made to be a recreation but a historical interpretation of Native American games and activities presented for the campers.  This program has since ended though. 

Campsites at Ingersoll are divided into three ridges: North, South, and West. North ridge contains the most developed campsites, with platform tents and cots for lodging in the high, shady woods. South Ridge contains a mix of developed and primitive campsites in a lower, forested area. West Ridge campsites are all primitive and in flat, open areas with few pavilions. There are two large shower facilities shared by all campsites, and every campsite has its own latrine and water spigot. In recent years, filtered water "hydration stations" have been added at various central locations around camp, the first being near the Trading Post. However, even this filtered water is still known by scouts as "Inger-Water", due to its notable amounts of iron in the taste. There are also many areas for Gaga ball to be played.

In 2014, ISR replaced its aging pool house facility with a new, modern pool house. The new facility includes changing rooms, showers, and private bathroom facilities. Soon after, much of the aging piping for the pool itself had to be replaced early on in the summer of 2014 due to several breakages that made the pool unusable.

As well as the new pool facilities, wilderness engineers at ISR helped install new cabins near the shooting ranges before the 2014 camping season. The cabins initially provided more and better accommodations for the summer-long staff until the RMS Lodge was built in 2018-19. They now are used for off-season camping and may someday become a new campsite on North Ridge. The new RMS Lodge houses 44 staff members during the summer and acts as the premier conference center during the off-season. It is climate-controlled, and it includes heated floors, a kitchen, laundry machines, and a large meeting room.

The summer of 2014 also saw the addition of a new STEM area. The area is used to cover many new merit badges, including Game Design, Aviation, Space Exploration, Chess, Invention. The area is located at the former Chaplain's Shelter next to the Wilderness Training Center and Camp Office.

History
In the late 1950s, the Creve Coeur Council faced growing problems with its existing resident camp, Camp Wokanda. Its facilities, mostly constructed in the 1920s and 1930s, were inadequate, and it was being encroached upon by the urban sprawl of nearby Peoria. In 1960 it was decided that a new camp should be constructed, far enough from civilization that boys' survival skills could be put to the test. Other criteria for this new camp included a lake, a river, and enough space to allow campsites privacy and community. Many sites were considered, but eventually, a 600-acre plot located 36 miles west of Peoria on Illinois Route 116 near London Mills was chosen for its rolling hills, meadows, and natural woodlands, as well as its river access and location within the famous Spoon River country. The site also contained a brick ranch-style house far from the main road, considered perfect for housing a camp ranger.

With a site decided, the Creve Coeur Council then focused its efforts on paying for the land. At $60,000 (roughly $428,000 today), finding the money proved to be difficult. Hoping to find one donor who could cover the whole cost, an appeal was made to William P. Ingersoll, a philanthropist from nearby Canton, Illinois. After confirming for himself the validity of the request, Ingersoll agreed to pay for the entire property on the condition that his donation remains anonymous. So it was that in 1963, Wilderness Camp officially opened for its first camping season. Over the next decade, Ingersoll continued to anonymously fund the camp, allowing for the construction of new buildings and the acquisition of surrounding land, eventually bringing the camp to its current 960 acres. Following Ingersoll's death in 1972, the camp was renamed Ingersoll Scout Reservation in his honor with the permission of his remaining family.

Folklore
In Ingersoll's time as a Boy Scout camp, many rumors and myths about the camp have emerged among campers and staff. These stories are a vital part of the camp's identity.
 Given Ingersoll's strange asymmetrical layout, there has been much speculation over what was to become of the East Side. The most popular theory is that the East Side was supposed to become its own resident camp, but plans to do so were abandoned.
 It is said that the original owners of the brick ranch house (later moved to the front gate) were a businessman and his wife. The man would be away on business so frequently that his wife became despondent from the isolation. Eventually, she couldn't bear it any longer and hung herself in the shed behind the house. That shed, the Cedar Del Farm building, still stands to this day.
 There are many things rumored to be submerged in Lake Roberts, including a bulldozer (mired in mud during construction and impossible to remove) and an M16 rifle (dropped by an ROTC cadet doing aquatic exercises).
 Lakefront staff have long told of a gargantuan snapping turtle nicknamed "Jaws" that patrols the lake, stealing bait from hooks and putting up legendary fights on the line. Though many report sightings of Jaws, he (or she) has always managed to elude capture. The one exception being a brief capture and release in 2012.

Cache Lake Scout Camp
Cache Lake Scout Camp is located at Sand Point Lake Ontario. The original high adventure camp that would evolve into Cache Lake Scout Camp was located approximately 70 miles north of International Falls, Minnesota in an abandoned logging camp on Lake of the Woods at Nestor Falls in 1957. The camp was moved to Browns Bay in Crane Lake in northern Minnesota approximately 3 years later and named Cache Lake Scout Camp. The camp was moved one other time to the north of the Canadian / U.S. border to what is now known as Bach's Bay. The history of the creation and evolution of Cache Lake Scout Camp has been reproduced with the author's permission (J.N. Bach) at the "Evolution of Cache Lake" website provided.

Wenasa Quenhotan Lodge
The council is served by the Wenasa Quenhotan Lodge of the Order of the Arrow, the Boy Scouting program's national honor society.

See also
Scouting in Illinois

References

External links
 W.D. Boyce Council, BSA
 Ingersoll Scout Reservation
 ISR Staff Database
 Evolution of Cache Lake by J.N. Bach

Local councils of the Boy Scouts of America
Central Region (Boy Scouts of America)
Youth organizations based in Illinois
1972 establishments in Illinois